Arsenal Hill is a neighborhood in Columbia, South Carolina. Arsenal Hill was one of the first residential neighborhoods in the city and was the site of an arsenal during the Civil War.  The South Carolina Governor's Mansion is located in Arsenal Hill.  The current Governor's mansion is the only building left of The Arsenal which was the sister school of The Citadel, The Military College of South Carolina, in Charleston.  The remainder of The Arsenal's buildings were burned down by General William Sherman's troops during the Civil War.  In recent years new residential development has been created, led by architect Matt Varner, to take advantage of the areas views of the city and its proximity to Finlay Park.

References

Geography of Columbia, South Carolina
Industrial buildings and structures on the National Register of Historic Places in South Carolina
Buildings and structures in Columbia, South Carolina
National Register of Historic Places in Columbia, South Carolina